Alfred Grady Rose (January 26, 1905 – October 1985) was a tight end in the National Football League who played for the Providence Steam Roller and the Green Bay Packers.  Rose played collegiate ball for the University of Texas before playing professionally for 7 seasons.  He retired after the 1936 season.

References

1905 births
1985 deaths
People from Temple, Texas
American football tight ends
Texas Longhorns football players
Providence Steam Roller players
Green Bay Packers players
New York Yankees (1936 AFL) players